Guðrún Sóley Gunnarsdóttir (born 15 September 1982) is an Icelandic former football defender who was part of Iceland's national team and competed at UEFA Women's Euro 2009. Guðrún was the captain of Breiðablik and also played in Sweden's Damallsvenskan for Djurgårdens IF Dam. During her career she won the Icelandic championship five times and the Icelandic Cup three times. In 2004, she won the NCAA championship with the Notre Dame Fighting Irish.

Club career
Named in the Icelandic Úrvalsdeild's team of the year nine times, Guðrún was also named KR Reykjavík's player of the season in 2008. She had simultaneously completed a scholarship at the University of Notre Dame, where she played varsity soccer for the "Fighting Irish". For the 2009 season, Guðrún went on loan to Djurgårdens IF Dam in Sweden, where she joined compatriot Guðbjörg Gunnarsdóttir.

Guðrún played well in Sweden and was reportedly subject to approaches from Chicago Red Stars and Sky Blue FC of the American Women's Professional Soccer (WPS). A head injury sustained at UEFA Women's Euro 2009 proved more serious than anticipated and caused Guðrún's premature retirement from football. It was reported in July 2013 that she was contemplating a comeback with KR.

International career
Guðrún's senior international debut for Iceland was on 14 October 1999, in a 5–0 defeat by Germany.

Personal life 
A reader poll by Finnish newspaper Ilta-Sanomat saw Guðrún voted the most beautiful player at UEFA Women's Euro 2009, with more than twice as many votes as runner-up Kosovare Asllani. Since 2009 she has worked as an investment banker, with Sveriges Riksbank then Central Bank of Iceland.

Achievements 
Five times Icelandic champion
Three times Icelandic cup winner

Honours 
Player of the Year in Breiðablik in 2007.
Player of the Year in KR in 2008.
Sport Person of the Year in Seltjarnarnes in 1999.

References

External links

1981 births
Living people
Gudrun Soley Gunnarsdottirs
Damallsvenskan players
Djurgårdens IF Fotboll (women) players
Expatriate footballers in Sweden
Gudrun Soley Gunnarsdottir
Gudrun Soley Gunnarsdottir
Gudrun Soley Gunnarsdottir
Notre Dame Fighting Irish women's soccer players
Gudrun Soley Gunnarsdottir
Women's association football defenders